The Good Beginning is a 1953 British drama film directed by Gilbert Gunn and written by Janet Green and starring John Fraser, Eileen Moore and Peter Reynolds.

Cast
 John Fraser - Johnny Lipson
 Eileen Moore - Kit Lipson
 Peter Reynolds - Brian Watson
 Lana Morris - Evie Watson
 Humphrey Lestocq - Thorogood
 Hugh Pryse - Braithwaite
 Ann Stephens - Polly
 Peter Jones - Furrier
 David Kossoff - Dealer

References

Bibliography
 Harper, Sue & Porter, Vincent. British Cinema of the 1950s: The Decline of Deference. Oxford University Press, 2007.

External links

1953 films
1953 drama films
Films shot at Associated British Studios
Films directed by Gilbert Gunn
British drama films
British black-and-white films
1950s English-language films
1950s British films